Varada  is a village situated in Sirohi tehsil of Sirohi District of Rajasthan in Western India.  It lies on Sirohi - Jalore Highway, 27 km north of Sirohi and 48 km south of Jalore.
Only in Varada village you can find the famous "PILOO" tree. It is the only village having PILOO tree in entire Rajasthan.

Demographics
Population of Varada is 5,035 according to census 2001. where male population is 3,017 while female population is 2,018.

References

 Varada Population

Villages in Sirohi district